Paeonia clusii is a relatively low (25–50 cm) species of herbaceous peony with scented, white or pink flowers of up to 12 cm in diameter. In the wild, the species can only be found on the islands of Crete and Karpathos (subsp. clusii), and Rhodes (subsp. rhodia). It has pinkish-purple stem up to 30 cm long and glaucous dissected leaves. P. clusii blooms in mid-spring.

Description 
Paeonia clusii is a perennial, herbaceous plant of 25–50 cm high. Both diploid (2n=10) and tetraploid (2n=20) specimens have been found.

Root, stems and leaves 
The main roots are slightly tuberous, up to 2½ cm wide, with thinner carrot-shaped side roots. The stems are mostly tinged purple, with several (up to nine) scales at their base. Leaves are split into three sets of leaflets, themselves further divided into twenty three to forty eight, 2½–4½ cm wide, ovate to lanceolate (subspecies rhodia) or to ninety five lanceolate to linear, ½–3¼ cm wide, segments (in the typical subspecies). The leaf is mostly hairless, but sometimes the lower surface carries a few hairs.

Flower, fruit and seed 
The flowers are set individually at the tip of the stems, and are subtended by one or two bracts that look like small segmented leaves. There are three or four rounded sepals, green but purple around the margin, and with a rounded tip. Within are seven white or pink petals of 4–5 cm long and 2½–4 cm wide. The many stamens consist of purple filaments topped by yellow anthers. The disk that encircle the carpels is ½–1 mm high and covered in soft hair. Two to four (or rarely only one) red carpels are covered in soft, white, 2–2½ mm long hairs and topped by an almost seated flattened, recurving, red stigma 1½–2 mm wide. Each carpel later develops into an ellipsoid fruit called a follicle, that is 3½–4 cm long and about 1½ cm wide, and which is curved down when ripe, and contains oval black seeds of 8 mm long and 5 mm in diameter.

Differences between the subspecies 
Subspecies rhodia is characterised by twenty three to forty eight, ovate to lanceolate leaf segments, each between 2½ and 4½ cm wide. Subspecies clusii has between twenty three and ninety five leaf segments in the lower leaves. The segments are lanceolate to linear, each usually no more than 2⅔ cm wide, but rare exceptions to 3¼ cm.

Taxonomy 
In 1824, Joseph Sabine describes Paeonia cretica based on a specimen from the University of Oxford Botanic Garden, which later turned out to be synonymous to Paeonia arietina (named in 1818), and this plant probably originated from mainland Turkey, not from Crete. Another specimen, now from Crete, was described as P. cretica in 1828 by Tausch, but at that moment the name was no longer available, and hence invalid. Stern proposed P. clusii to replace Tausch's name. Stearn, in 1941, distinguished the population on Rhodes as a separate species and named it P. rhodia. Tzanoudakis however, points out it only differs in the number and shape of the leaf segments, and thus regards it as a subspecies of P. clusii.

Etymology 
Paeonia clusii was named in honor of the Dutch botanist Carolus Clusius, who was the first to write about a white flowered peony from Crete, already in 1601.

Ecology 
The typical subspecies grows in maquis on limestone between 200–1900 m altitude. Subspecies rhodia occurs as undergrowth of pines at an elevation of 350–850 m.

Cultivation 
Rhodes' peony likes well-drained, loamy soil or compost. It's hardy in the UK, but because it starts growing in late winter the leaves may be damaged by frosts. As can be expected from a plant from the Mediterranean, they suffer from wet soil.

References

External links 
 photos

clusii
Endemic flora of Greece
Plants described in 1828